"Whatever Happened to Old-Fashioned Love" is a song recorded by American country music artist B. J. Thomas. It was released in May 1983 as the first single from the album New Looks. The song was written by Lewis Anderson.

The song was his biggest hit in over five years. "Whatever Happened to Old-Fashioned Love" was the second of three number ones on the country chart. It was his first number one since "(Hey Won't You Play) Another Somebody Done Somebody Wrong Song" eight years before. The single stayed at number one for one week and spent a total of fourteen weeks on the country chart. The song was Thomas' final entry on the pop chart, reaching number 93.

The song was a Top 20 pop hit in the UK for Daniel O'Donnell in the 1990s.

Charts

Weekly charts

Year-end charts

References 

1983 singles
B. J. Thomas songs
Columbia Records singles
Songs written by Lewis Anderson
1983 songs